Lieutenant-Colonel Sir Henry Vassall Webster KTS (February 1793 – 19 April 1847) was a British Army officer, aide-de-camp to the Prince of Orange at the Battle of Waterloo.

He was the second son of Sir Godfrey Webster, 4th Baronet and Elizabeth Fox, Baroness Holland.

He joined the Army in 1810 and rose to lieutenant-colonel in 1831. In 1843, he was knighted.

Webster married Grace (d. 27 March 1866), the only daughter and heir of Samuel Boddington, on 23 October 1824.

He died on 19 April 1847 from self-inflicted knife wounds. He is buried at Kensal Green Cemetery.

His portrait was painted by Martin Archer Shee.

References

1793 births
1847 deaths
British military personnel who committed suicide
Burials at Kensal Green Cemetery
Henry
Suicides by sharp instrument in the United Kingdom
1840s suicides
Knights Bachelor